Qajar Kheyl-e Khurandi (also Romanized as Qājār Kheyl-e Khūrandī; also known as Qājār Kheyl) is a village in Gahrbaran-e Jonubi Rural District, Gahrbaran District, Miandorud County, Mazandaran Province, Iran. At the 2006 census, its population was 333, in 89 families.

References 

Populated places in Miandorud County